The A.P. Chekhov Literary Museum is a museum in Taganrog, Rostov Oblast, Russia. It is situated in the building of the former men's classical gymnasium, where Anton Chekhov studied. It is part of Taganrog State literary and historical-architectural museum-national park.

History
The opening of the building of the male gymnasium was in 1843, the architect of the project was Francesco Boffo, the main style of the building was the direction of Russian provincial classicism. From 1868 to 1879, the student of this gymnasium was the famous Russian writer Anton Pavlovich Chekhov. The writer drew ideas for writing stories: "And then and now", "Tutor", "Teacher of Literature", "The Case with the Classic", "Ariadne", "The Man in a Cover". Then in the building of the gymnasium the secondary school №2 began to be located, which received the name of Chekhov in 1954. The school functioned until 1975, and in 1980 it was decided to create a museum complex. The creation took place in several stages: the opening of the museum was in 1935, the opening of the literary and memorial exhibition "The Writer and the Motherland" was in 1980–1985.

Modernity
The exposition of the Museum represents a study of the life and work of Anton Pavlovich Chekhov and the influence of Taganrog on his works. 29 January 2010, for the 150th anniversary of the birth, a new exposition was opened "A. P. Chekhov: his native city and the world." The exhibition has more than 1600 exhibits.
In the museum there were such exhibitions as "Wax sculptures of St. Petersburg", "Country of Christmas tree toys", "Taganrog-Yalta. The genius of Chekhov unites", a virtual exhibition" The City of Chekhov by the eyes of artists." Also the activity of the museum is often covered in local mass media.

See also
 Birth house of Anton Chekhov
 Chekhov Shop
 Taganrog City Architectural Development Museum

References

Links
 TAGANROG STATE LITERARY, HISTORICAL AND ARCHITECTURAL MUSEUM-RESERVE
 Literary Museum of A.P. Chekhov

Museums established in 1935
Museums in Taganrog